Milan Oraze (born 29 March 1967) is a retired Austrian football goalkeeper and later manager.

References

1967 births
Living people
Austrian footballers

FC Tirol Innsbruck players
SV Ried players
SKN St. Pölten players
Budapest Honvéd FC players
Association football goalkeepers
Austrian Football Bundesliga players
Austrian expatriate footballers
Expatriate footballers in Hungary
Austrian expatriate sportspeople in Hungary
Sportspeople from Klagenfurt
Footballers from Carinthia (state)